Young Ivanhoe is a 1995 romantic adventure TV movie based on the 1819 novel by Sir Walter Scott. It was directed by Ralph L. Thomas and starred Kristen Holden-Ried as Ivanhoe. Other starring actors were Stacy Keach, Margot Kidder, Nick Mancuso, Rachel Blanchard, and Matthew Daniels.

External links 
 

1995 television films
1995 films
1990s adventure films
1995 romantic drama films
Adventure television films
Films based on adventure novels
Films based on Ivanhoe
Television shows based on Ivanhoe
Swashbuckler films
Canadian drama television films
Canadian adventure drama films
English-language Canadian films
Films directed by Ralph L. Thomas
Canadian romantic drama films
1990s Canadian films